961 Gunnie (prov. designation:  or ) is a very dark background asteroid from the central regions of the asteroid belt, approximately  in diameter. It was discovered on 10 October 1921, by German astronomer Karl Reinmuth at the Heidelberg-Königstuhl State Observatory. The C/X-type asteroid has a rotation period of 21.4 hours. It was named after Gunnie Asplind, daughter of Swedish astronomer Bror Asplind (1890–1954).

Orbit and classification 

Gunnie is a non-family asteroid of the main belt's background population when applying the hierarchical clustering method to its proper orbital elements. It orbits the Sun in the central asteroid belt at a distance of 2.4–2.9 AU once every 4 years and 5 months (1,615 days; semi-major axis of 2.69 AU). Its orbit has an eccentricity of 0.09 and an inclination of 11° with respect to the ecliptic. The body's observation arc begins at the South African Johannesburg Observatory in June 1951, or 30 years after its official discovery observation at Heidelberg Observatory.

Naming 

This minor planet was named after Gunnie Asplind, daughter of Swedish astronomer Bror Ansgar Asplind (1890–1954). Asteroids 958 Asplinda, 959 Arne and 960 Birgit are named after him and his other two children, respectively. The  was mentioned in The Names of the Minor Planets by Paul Herget in 1955.

Physical characteristics 

In the Bus–Binzel SMASS classification, Gunnie is an X-type asteroid, while in the SDSS-based taxonomy, it is a carbonaceous C-type asteroid.

Rotation period 

In 2018, Czech astronomers Josef Ďurech and Josef Hanuš published a modeled lightcurve using photometric data from the Gaia probe's second data release. It showed a sidereal period of  hours, and gave two spin axes at (37.0°, 24.0°) and (220.0°, 7.0°) in ecliptic coordinates (λ, β).

Diameter and albedo 

The Collaborative Asteroid Lightcurve Link derives an albedo of 0.0311 and a diameter of 37.78 km based on an absolute magnitude of 11.5.

References

External links 
 Lightcurve Database Query (LCDB), at www.minorplanet.info
 Dictionary of Minor Planet Names, Google books
 Discovery Circumstances: Numbered Minor Planets (1)-(5000) – Minor Planet Center
 
 

000961
Discoveries by Karl Wilhelm Reinmuth
Named minor planets
000961
19211010